Alexander Victor Schauffele (born October 25, 1993) is an American professional golfer who plays on the PGA Tour, having won seven times since turning professional in 2015. Schauffele's best major finish is tied second at both the 2018 Open Championship and the 2019 Masters. Schauffele also has a win on the European Tour. Schauffele won the Olympic gold medal at the men's individual golf event of the 2020 Summer Olympics.

Early life
Schauffele was born on October 25, 1993 in San Diego, California to a French/German naturalized immigrant father and a Taiwanese naturalized immigrant mother who grew up in Japan. His father has been his only swing coach throughout his golf career. Schauffele’s teaching philosophy relies heavily on basic ball flight laws and golf club mechanics – as a result Schauffele had not seen his own swing until about age 18.

Two of Schauffele's great-grandfathers played soccer at the European premier level. Johann Hoffmann played for the Austria national football team and won multiple Austrian (SK Rapid Wien), Bohemian (DSV Saaz), and French (FC Sochaux; Racing Strasbourg) national titles. After playing football for VfB Stuttgart, Richard Schauffele excelled in track and field, garnering over 40 titles in discus, javelin and shot put for 2 clubs, the Stuttgarter Kickers and the Cannstatter Ruder-Club.

Amateur career
Schauffele was the individual winner of the 2011 California State High School Championship (California Interscholastic Federation, CIF), playing for Scripps Ranch High School.
After graduating from high school, Schauffele played his freshman year in college at California State University Long Beach, where he garnered the 2012 Big West Conference Freshman of the Year as well as the 2012 First Team All-Big West awards.

Prior to his sophomore year, Schauffele transferred to San Diego State University, where eventually he would play out his college career and graduate in 2015. During his three years at SDSU, Schauffele was a Ping and Golfweek Third Team All-American.  Scholastically, he was twice awarded the Mountain West Conference All-Academic Team Award. At SDSU, he holds the records for all-time lowest tournament score against par (−17); all-time career scoring average (71.50); as well as the seasonal records for par-5 performance (4.5135); birdies (171) and eagles (9).

Schauffele defeated Beau Hossler to win the 2014 California State Amateur Championship at La Costa Resort and Spa. Later that summer, the two long time rivals met again in a final at Chicago's Beverly Country Club for the 2014 Western Amateur where Schauffele lost to Hossler in the final match in dramatic fashion.

Schauffele accumulated a collegiate record that features 3 wins, 4 runners-up, 19 top-fives and 27 top-tens in a total of 50 tournaments. He was ranked in the top 10 of the World Amateur Golf Ranking at the time he turned professional in 2015.

Professional career
After turning professional in June 2015, Schauffele entered the 2015 Web.com Tour Qualifying Tournament in fall. He was runner up in first stage at Southern Dunes GC in Maricopa, Arizona. He went on to win second stage at Oak Valley GC in Beaumont, California and ultimately, narrowly, earned his Web.com Tour card in the finals in Florida in a tie for 45th.

2016 Web.com Tour
In 2016, Schauffele played a full season (23 events) on the Web.com Tour. He finished 26th on the regular-season money list, missing a PGA Tour card for 2017 by less than $1000.00, but went on to earn a card through the Web.com Tour Finals by finishing 15th on the Finals money list (excluding the 25 regular-season graduates).

2016–17 PGA Tour: two wins, Rookie of the Year
Schauffele made his PGA Tour debut at the CareerBuilder Challenge in La Quinta, California. In June 2017, at the 2017 U.S. Open held at Erin Hills, Schauffele recorded a bogey-free 6-under-par 66 – it was the first time a player has returned a bogey-free round of 66 or better in their first appearance in U.S. Open. He subsequently became one of only 15 players to ever reach 10 under par at a U.S. Open. He eventually finished in a tie for fifth place, earning him an exemption into the 2018 championship.

Three weeks later, in July, Schauffele recorded his first PGA Tour victory, at the Greenbrier Classic. With the win, he earned exemptions into the Open Championship, via the Open Qualifying Series, the PGA Championship and the 2018 Masters Tournament.

Schauffele qualified for the end of season Tour Championship by moving up to 26th in the standings, from 33rd at the start of the FedEx Cup Playoffs. There he birdied the 72nd hole to claim his second tour victory, by one stroke over Justin Thomas, and become the first rookie to win the Tour Championship. It was also the first time a rookie had won any FedEx Cup playoff event. The win moved Schauffele to third place in the final FedEx Cup standings, bettering the previous best mark by a rookie held by Jordan Spieth by four positions, and gave him a three-year exemption on the PGA Tour, through the 2019–20 season.

During 2017, Schauffele rose to 32nd in the Official World Golf Ranking, up 267 spots from his 2016 year-end position of 299. He was voted "Rookie of the Year 2017" by his peers.

2017–18 PGA Tour
At the beginning of 2018, Schauffele switched equipment manufacturers, signing an endorsement deal with Callaway, having previously been sponsored by TaylorMade. In May, he finished T2 at the 2018 Players Championship at TPC Sawgrass with a score of 14 under par. In the Open Championship at Carnoustie, he tied for second with a score of six-under-par.

Schauffele began the 2018 FedEx Cup Playoffs in 28th position in the standings. Entering the third of four events in the playoff series, the 2018 BMW Championship, he was 41st, needing to move up at least eleven spots to advance to the Tour Championship. He finished in a tie for third to rise to 18th position. That finish allowed him the opportunity to attempt to defend his 2017 Tour Championship title. Schauffele ultimately finished T7 at the 2018 Tour Championship, while placing 15th in the season-long FedEx Cup.

2018 European Tour
Schauffele joined the 2018 European Tour as an associate member. With his win at the 2018 WGC-HSBC Champions, Schauffele rose in the European Tour's Order of Merit, the year long points race dubbed the European Tour Race to Dubai, to 4th position. Schauffele entered the European Tour final event, the DP World Tour Championship, Dubai, in 5th position. With a final round score of 6-under-par 66, which equaled the lowest score of the day, Schauffele finished T16. This ensured a season-ending 4th position on the Order of Merit and participation in the 2018 European Tour's bonus pool.

2018–19 PGA Tour: 2 wins; Presidents Cup
In October 2018, Schauffele won the WGC-HSBC Champions event in Shanghai, China at the Sheshan Golf Club, in a playoff, defeating Tony Finau on the first extra hole. In January 2019, he won the Sentry Tournament of Champions at The Plantation Course at Kapalua Resort in Maui, Hawaii, returning a course record equalling 11-under-par 62 in the final round to pass Gary Woodland, who he had trailed by five shots entering the final round.

In April, Schauffele tied for second in the Masters Tournament, one stroke behind champion Tiger Woods. It was his third top-five in eight starts at major championships. He led the field with 25 birdies, becoming the third player since 1980 to have 25 or more birdies in a single Masters, joining Phil Mickelson (25 in 2001) and Jordan Spieth (28 in 2015). In June, he finished tied for 3rd at the U.S. Open at Pebble Beach Golf Links in Pebble Beach, California. At The Open Championship in July 2019, he became the first player to have their driver fail The R&A's conformity test.

In early August 2019, Schauffele placed 4th in the inaugural 2019 Wyndham Rewards Top 10. Through the playoffs, he fell to 8th in the standings entering the Tour Championship; this gave him a 6 shot deficit to the leader, Justin Thomas, under the new handicapping system. He had erased the deficit after the first round with a score of 6-under-par 64 and was tied for the lead going into the second round. He ultimately finished in second place, but took maximum world ranking points having returned the lowest aggregate score.

In December 2019, Schauffele played on the U.S. team at the 2019 Presidents Cup at Royal Melbourne Golf Club in Australia. The U.S. team won 16–14. Schauffele went 3-2-0 and won his Sunday singles match against International team star and veteran Adam Scott. Some in golf media called Schauffele the "unsung hero" of the U.S. team.

2021: Olympic Gold
At the Masters in April, Schauffele was two shots behind the leader on the 16th tee, and in second place during the final round. However, at the hole he scored a triple bogey, and ultimately finished third. In August, Schauffele recorded a final-round of 67 to win the Olympic gold medal; he made an up-and-down for par on the final hole to beat Slovakian Rory Sabbatini by one shot. With the accomplishment, Schauffele became the first American since 1900 to win an Olympic gold medal in golf. In September, Schauffele played on the U.S. team in the 2021 Ryder Cup at Whistling Straits in Kohler, Wisconsin. The U.S. team won 19–9 and Schauffele went 3–1–0, winning in both fourball and foursomes, and losing his Sunday singles match against Rory McIlroy.

2022
In April, Schauffele won the Zurich Classic of New Orleans, a team event, with playing partner Patrick Cantlay. In June, he won the Travelers Championship for his sixth PGA Tour victory. In July, he won the J. P. McManus Pro-Am, an unofficial event on the European Tour held at Adare Manor, after shooting a course record 64 in the first round. The same week he won the co-santioned Genesis Scottish Open played at the Renaissance Club in East Lothian, Scotland. It was his third PGA Tour victory in the 2021–22 season, and his seventh overall.

Schauffele qualified for the U.S. team at the 2022 Presidents Cup; he won three and lost one of the four matches he played.

Amateur wins
2011 California State High School Championship
2012 OGIO UC Santa Barbara Invite
2014 Lamkin Grips SD Classic, California State Amateur Championship
2015 Barona Collegiate Cup

Source:

Professional wins (10)

PGA Tour wins (7)

1Co-sanctioned by the European Tour

PGA Tour playoff record (1–2)

European Tour wins (2)

1Co-sanctioned by the PGA Tour

European Tour playoff record (1–1)

Other wins (3)

Results in major championships
Results not in chronological order in 2020.

CUT = missed the half-way cut
"T" = tied
NT = No tournament due to COVID-19 pandemic

Summary

Most consecutive cuts made – 12 (2018 Masters – 2021 Masters)
Longest streak of top-10s – 2 (twice)

Results in The Players Championship

CUT = missed the halfway cut
"T" indicates a tie for a place
C = Canceled after the first round due to the COVID-19 pandemic

World Golf Championships

Wins (1)

Results timeline

1Cancelled due to COVID-19 pandemic

 

NT = No tournament
"T" = Tied
Note that the Championship and Invitational were discontinued from 2022.

PGA Tour career summary

* As of the 2021 season

European Tour career summary

* As of December 31, 2020. Note that there is double counting of money and finishes for majors and World Golf Championships between PGA Tour and European Tour stats

U.S. national team appearances
Professional
Presidents Cup: 2019 (winners), 2022 (winners)
Ryder Cup: 2021 (winners)

See also
2016 Web.com Tour Finals graduates

References

External links

San Diego State University Aztecs – profile
Long Beach State University 49ers – profile

American male golfers
PGA Tour golfers
Olympic golfers of the United States
Golfers at the 2020 Summer Olympics
Olympic gold medalists for the United States in golf
Medalists at the 2020 Summer Olympics
Korn Ferry Tour graduates
San Diego State Aztecs men's golfers
Golfers from San Diego
American people of French descent
American people of German descent
American sportspeople of Taiwanese descent
Scripps Ranch High School alumni
1993 births
Living people